МSМО 7.62 or WHC 7.62 (from ) are an ice hockey team in the Zhenskaya Hockey League (ZhHL). They play in Voskresensk, Moscow Oblast at the Podmoskovie Ice Palace, with a capacity of 4500.

History   
The team was quickly formed to fill the vacancy left in the league when Dynamo St. Petersburg folded in July 2020. The team name represents the diameter of a hockey puck. The first player the team signed with previous professional experience was 18-year old Valeria Dryndina, who had previously played with HC Tornado, with the entirety of their roster for the 2020–21 ZhHL season being composed of players 18 years of age and under; the average age of the roster was approximately 16.2 years.

The team's first ZhHL match was a 3–0 loss to SKSO Yekaterinburg on 5 October 2020. The club picked up their first victory the next day, beating SKSO 2–1.

Players and personnel

2021–22 roster 

Coaching staff and team personnel
 Head coach: Alexander Syrtsov
 Assistant coach: Alexander Karpov
 Team manager: Roman Sasin

Team captaincy history 
 Darya Kovalenko, 2020–2021
 Alina Ichayeva, 2021–

Head coaches 
 Alexander Syrtsov, 2020–

References

External links  
 Team information and statistics from EliteProspects.com
 

Ice hockey teams in Russia
Women's ice hockey teams in Europe
Ice hockey clubs established in 2020
2020 establishments in Russia
Zhenskaya Hockey League teams
Women's ice hockey in Russia